The 1907 Mississippi gubernatorial election took place on November 5, 1907, in order to elect the Governor of Mississippi. Incumbent Democrat James K. Vardaman was term-limited, and could not run for reelection to a second term.

Democratic primary

The Democratic primary election was held on August 1, 1907, with the runoff held on August 22, 1907.

Results

General election
In the general election, Democratic candidate Edmond Noel, a former state senator, ran unopposed.

Results

References

1907
gubernatorial
Mississippi
November 1907 events